Sentinel-2B is a European optical imaging satellite that was launched on 7 March 2017. It is the second Sentinel-2 satellite launched as part of the European Space Agency's Copernicus Programme, and its orbit will be phased 180° against Sentinel-2A. The satellite carries a wide swath high-resolution multispectral imager with 13 spectral bands. It will provide information for agriculture and forestry, among others allowing for prediction of crop yields.

Mission history 
A €105 million contract for the construction of the spacecraft was signed in March 2010 by ESA's Director of Earth Observation Programmes and the CEO of Astrium Satellites. It was completed in June 2016, and the satellite was transported to the European Space Research and Technology Centre (ESTEC) for the test campaign.

Launch 
The spacecraft arrived at the Centre Spatial Guyanais on 6 January 2017 for pre-launch operations.

Launch took place at the nominal time of 01:49:24 UTC on 7 March 2017 on board Vega flight VV09. The spacecraft was injected into its target orbit at 02:47:21 UTC.

References

External links 
 Sentinel-2 programme at ESA's Sentinel Online
 Sentinel-2 programme at ESA.int
 Real-time orbital tracking - uphere.space

Copernicus Programme
Earth observation satellites of the European Space Agency
Spacecraft launched by Vega rockets
Spacecraft launched in 2017
Twin satellites